Sattler College is a private college that associates itself with "the historic Christian faith." It aims to "equip Jesus’ peaceful revolution" through relational discipleship and academic excellence. The school was founded by Dr. Finny Kuruvilla and welcomed its first class in the fall of 2018, received national accreditation in 2021, and graduated its first class in May of 2022. Projected external funding for the school is $30 million over the course of 25 years. Its campus is in a high-rise office building in downtown Boston, overlooking the Charles River and Massachusetts State House.

History
In 2015, Dr. Finny Kuruvilla presented his idea of a college with "a comprehensive curriculum and beautiful campus overlooking the Boston Harbor... no traditional campus would offer a first-class education for only $9,000 each year." He brought together a board of 6 people including 2 with PhDs from Ivy League schools and 2 with law degrees. In December 2016, Massachusetts Board of Higher Education approved a measure to allow Sattler College to grant degrees and exist as an autonomous institution. Sattler College's first application opened in October 2017 and it began its first semester with students in the fall of 2018.

Campus

On October 26, 2017, the college announced that it had secured the 17th floor of the Leverett Saltonstall Building for its first campus. It is located in downtown Boston in Beacon Hill. The college says that it had no plans for building science labs. Instead, they plan "to have students take laboratory courses through the Harvard University Extension School, Northeastern University’s College of Professional Studies, or elsewhere and transfer credits back to Sattler." The college does plan to lease out apartment space to its students to provide housing options.

Academics

Academic model
Sattler adheres to the Oxford academic model. Classes are mostly discussion-based, with briefer lectures and greater student involvement.  They told the Massachusetts BHE, "Faculty will serve primarily as mentors and discussion leaders, not as lecturers or providers of information. Students will be directed to on-line lecture sets and will be responsible for learning outside of class, e.g., researching, reading, and watching video lectures. In class, ideas will be reinforced, discussed, and critiqued.

Instead of having a library of their own, Sattler utilizes the Boston Public Library for its students. Sattler also provides electronic library resources by subscribing to the eBook services provided by two leading digital library service providers: Proquest (ebrary) and EBSCO."

Degree programs
In its December 2016 decision, the Massachusetts Board of Higher Education granted Sattler College the ability to grant the following degrees:
 Bachelor of Science in Business
 Bachelor of Science in Computer Science
 Bachelor of Science in Human Biology
 Bachelor of Arts in Biblical and Religious Studies
 Bachelor of Arts in History

The college has announced that, "within ten years [by 2028], we plan to seek authorization to also offer programs in Civil Engineering, English, Education, Journalism, Mathematics, Physics, and Social Sciences."

Religious affiliation
The college is named after Michael Sattler, a sixteenth-century Anabaptist Christian martyr. Though the school is aligned with the theology of Conservative Anabaptism, it is not affiliated with a particular denomination; Sattler College espouses principles from the early church and looks to the example of persecuted Christians. Michael Sattler believed in the power of redemptive love and emulated the early church and Anabaptist groups by following Jesus's instruction to love one's enemies.

Core values
One of Sattler College's self-proclaimed distinctives is its focus on "The Three C's": Core, Christian Character, and Cost. Sattler requires an extensive core curriculum based on the liberal arts, including writing, history, biology, and math. Students are required to take religion courses on Christianity. These courses include learning Old Testament Hebrew and New Testament Greek, church history, and studying the basics of Christianity. Furthermore, the college focuses on students' Christian development through "wise study, mentoring, and discipleship."

References

External links
Sattler College website

 
Universities and colleges in Boston
Private universities and colleges in Massachusetts
Anabaptist organizations
Nondenominational Christian universities and colleges in the United States
Nondenominational Christian universities and colleges